Syed Mir Abdullah Shirazi, was a Faujdar of Mughal Bengal's Sylhet Sarkar during the reign of Emperor Aurangzeb and governorship of Subahdar Azim-ush-Shan. He was the successor of Ahmad Majid. The name Shirazi suggests that he is a Persian and originates from the Iranian city of Shiraz. He may also have been a relative of Lutfullah Shirazi, who was the Faujdar of Sylhet in 1663. In 1699 (1110 Hijri), Abdullah built a large domed mosque in Shah Jalal's dargah complex towards the south. The ruins of this mosque can be seen, located just east of the dargah pond. A Persian inscription was found near the ruins detailing the mosque's construction and mentions Shirazi's background. An inscription next to a mosque situated next to the dargah of Shah Paran states that it was built by a certain Abdullah and Syed Murtaza Ali states that it is possible that they are both the same person. He was succeeded by Karguzar Khan.

Gallery

See also
History of Sylhet
Sikandar Khan Ghazi

References

Rulers of Sylhet
Indian people of Iranian descent
People from Shiraz
17th-century rulers in Asia
17th-century Indian Muslims
17th-century Iranian politicians